Rosewood is an unincorporated community in Marshall County, Minnesota, United States.

Notes

Unincorporated communities in Marshall County, Minnesota
Unincorporated communities in Minnesota